Nana Oduro Nimapau II was a traditional ruler in Ghana and Paramount Chief of Esumeja. His official title was Esumejahene - Chief of Esumeja. He was the sixth president of the National House of Chiefs and served from 1992 to 1998. He also served as president of Ghana Musicians Union in the 1960s.

References 

Ghanaian leaders
Ghanaian musicians